Amazfit is a Chinese smart wearable brand established in September 2015 and headquartered in Hefei. Its products are manufactured and owned by Zepp Health. The brand offers wearable devices including smartwatches, fitness bands, and equipment related to health and sports.

In January 2020, it attended the Consumer Electronics Show 2020 in Las Vegas. At the middle of October 2021, Amazfit updated its brand identity with the slogan "Up Your Game".

History
In 2016, the first smartwatch of Amazfit was introduced. In April 2017, it launched the Amazfit Health Band.

A self-developed chipset called the "Huangshan-1"  was exhibited at Mobile World Congress and applied to Amazfit devices in 2019.

In July 2019, the lens of the photoelectric module of an Amazfit smartwatch dislodged, causing a user's skin to be burned.

After the launch of Amazfit GTR series smartwatches, some problems were revealed, such as the screen was easy to be scratched and the positioning was severely shifted, which affected the usage.

In April 2020, its parent company partnered with a laboratory led by Zhong Nanshan to use wearable devices to track respiratory diseases.

References

Chinese brands
Companies based in Hefei
Wearable devices
Consumer electronics brands
2015 establishments in China